Arturo Iglesias (born 3 July 1951) is a Guatemalan sports shooter. He competed at the 1976 Summer Olympics, the 1980 Summer Olympics and the 1984 Summer Olympics.

References

1951 births
Living people
Guatemalan male sport shooters
Olympic shooters of Guatemala
Shooters at the 1976 Summer Olympics
Shooters at the 1980 Summer Olympics
Shooters at the 1984 Summer Olympics
Place of birth missing (living people)